In physics, the Pati–Salam model is a Grand Unified Theory (GUT) proposed in 1974 by Abdus Salam and Jogesh Pati. Like other GUTs, its goal is to explain the seeming arbitrariness and complexity of the Standard Model in terms of a simpler, more fundamental theory that unifies what are in the Standard Model disparate particles and forces. The Pati–Salam unification is based on there being four quark color charges, dubbed red, green, blue and violet (or originally lilac), instead of the conventional three, with the new "violet" quark being identified with the leptons. The model also has left–right symmetry and predicts the existence of a high energy right handed weak interaction with heavy W' and Z' bosons and right-handed neutrinos.

Originally the fourth color was labelled "lilac" to alliterate with "lepton". Pati–Salam is an alternative to the Georgi–Glashow  unification also proposed in 1974. Both can be embedded within an  unification model.

Core theory 
This needs some explanation. This includes the right-handed neutrino, which is now likely believed to exist. See neutrino oscillations.

See restricted representation.

The weak hypercharge, Y, is the sum of the two matrices:

It is possible to extend the Pati–Salam group so that it has two connected components. The relevant group is now the semidirect product . The last  also needs explaining. This explains the name left and right and is one of the main motivations for originally studying this model. This extra "left-right symmetry" restores the concept of parity which had been shown not to hold at low energy scales for the weak interaction. This is the simplest extension of the minimal left-right model unifying QCD with B−L.

Since the homotopy group

this model predicts monopoles. See 't Hooft–Polyakov monopole.

This model was invented by Jogesh Pati and Abdus Salam.

This model doesn't predict gauge mediated proton decay (unless it is embedded within an even larger GUT group).

Differences from the SU(5) unification
As mentioned above, both the Pati–Salam and Georgi–Glashow  unification models can be embedded in a  unification. The difference between the two models then lies in the way that the  symmetry is broken, generating different particles that may or may not be important at low scales and accessible by current experiments. If we look at the individual models, the most important difference is in the origin of the weak hypercharge. In the  model by itself there is no left-right symmetry (although there could be one in a larger unification in which the model is embedded), and the weak hypercharge is treated separately from the color charge. When those two groups break then the two parts together eventually unify into the usual weak hypercharge .

Minimal supersymmetric Pati–Salam

Spacetime
The  superspace extension of  Minkowski spacetime

Spatial symmetry
N=1 SUSY over  Minkowski spacetime with R-symmetry

Gauge symmetry group

Global internal symmetry

Vector superfields
Those associated with the  gauge symmetry

Chiral superfields
As complex representations:

Superpotential
A generic invariant renormalizable superpotential is a (complex)  and  invariant cubic polynomial in the superfields. It is a linear combination of the following terms:

Left-right extension
We can extend this model to include left-right symmetry.

Sources
 Graham G. Ross, Grand Unified Theories, Benjamin/Cummings, 1985, 
 Anthony Zee, Quantum Field Theory in a Nutshell, Princeton U. Press, Princeton, 2003,

References

External links
 Proton decay, annihilation or fusion? by Wu, Dan-Di; Li, Tie-Zhong, Zeitschrift für Physik C, Volume 27, Issue 2, pp. 321–323 preview Fusion of all three quarks is the only decay mechanism mediated by the Higgs particle, not the gauge bosons, in the Pati–Salam model
The Algebra of Grand Unified Theories John Huerta. Slide show: contains an overview of Pati–Salam
the Pati-Salam model Motivation for the Pati–Salam model

Grand Unified Theory
Abdus Salam